Miss Alsace is a French beauty pageant which selects a representative for the Miss France national competition from the region of Alsace. The first Miss Alsace was crowned in 1939, although the competition was not organized regularly until 1984.

The current Miss Alsace is Camille Sedira, who was crowned Miss Alsace 2022 on 10 September 2022. Six women from Alsace have been crowned Miss France:
Joséphine Ladwig, who was crowned Miss France 1940
Suzanne Angly, who was crowned Miss France 1969
Suzanne Iskandar, who was crowned Miss France 1985
Nathalie Marquay, who was crowned Miss France 1987
Lætitia Bléger, who was crowned Miss France 2004
Delphine Wespiser, who was crowned Miss France 2012

Results summary
Miss France: Joséphine Ladwig (1939); Suzanne Angly (1968); Suzanne Iskandar (1984); Nathalie Marquay (1986); Lætitia Bléger (2003); Delphine Wespiser (2011)
1st Runner-Up: Irène Hell (1966); Claudia Frittolini (1987); Dorothée Lambert (1988)
2nd Runner-Up: Evelyne Ricket (1957); Sonia Kielwasser (1967); Cécile Wolfrom (2021)
3rd Runner-Up: Anne Jandera (1991); Aurélie Roux (2020)
4th Runner-Up: Martine Scheffler (1971); Alyssa Wurtz (2014)
6th Runner-Up: Florima Treiber (2007)
Top 12/Top 15: Régine Hubert (1990); Paola Palermo (1992); Barbara Fink (1999); Tiffany Rohrbach (2000); Céline Druz (2002); Stéphanie Wawrzyniak (2006); Laura Strubel (2013); Laura Muller (2015); Claire Godard (2016); Laura Theodori (2019)

Titleholders

Notes

References

External links

Miss France regional pageants
Beauty pageants in France
Women in France